Oaks Hotel, in Hammond, Louisiana, was built in 1905.  It is an L-shaped building that was listed on the National Register of Historic Places in 1979. It was designed by Favrot & Livaudais, an architectural firm active in Louisiana from 1891 to 1933.

Its National Register nomination stated:
The building's striking feature is its attenuated pedimented entrance portico which surmounts the entrance vestibule in the corner where the wings meet. Added in the 1920s, it appears to be constructed of standard commercially available members.

References

National Register of Historic Places in Tangipahoa Parish, Louisiana
Buildings and structures completed in 1905
Hotels in Louisiana